The Great Pretender is the first album by Lester Bowie recorded for ECM and released in 1981.

Reception
The Allmusic review by Michael G. Nastos awarded the album 4 stars, stating, "The Great Pretender is a perfect title for this effort, a mix of funk and humor, gospel and jazz, with no small points of reference to Dizzy Gillespie, early doo wop, Mahalia Jackson, James Brown, and Sun Ra... The Great Pretender falls just short of Bowie's magnum opus The 5th Power, but not by much in terms of sheer modernism. It's utterly enjoyable creative jazz, worthy of a space in your collection".

Track listing
 "The Great Pretender" (Buck Ram) - 16:22
 "It's Howdy Doody Time" (Edward Kean) - 2:08
 "When the Doom (Moon) Comes Over the Mountain" (Harry M. Woods, Howard E. Johnson; arranged by Lester Bowie) - 3:39
 "Rios Negroes" (Bowie) - 7:17
 "Rose Drop" (Bowie) - 7:28
 "Oh, How the Ghost Sings" (Bowie, Donald Smith, Fred Williams, Phillip Wilson, Manfred Eicher, Martin Wieland) 5:50

Personnel
Lester Bowie - trumpet
Hamiet Bluiett - baritone saxophone
Donald Smith - piano, organ
Fred Williams - bass, electric bass
Phillip Wilson - drums
Fontella Bass - vocals
David Peaston - vocals

References

1981 albums
ECM Records albums
Lester Bowie albums
Albums produced by Manfred Eicher